Houston Edward Summers IV (born October 26, 1983), known mononymously as Houston, is an American former R&B singer, best known for his hit single "I Like That".

Houston made headlines in 2005 when he attempted suicide in a London hotel room, and later gouged his eye out with a fork on the 13th floor of his hotel building. He was subsequently dropped from his contract with Capitol Records.

Early life 
Summers attended the Academy of Music at Hamilton High School in Los Angeles. He would regularly be invited to participate in activities taking place in the school's music academy. His management team recorded a videotape of Summers's performances, which they hoped would help the singer land a recording contract. He was signed to Capitol Records.

Career 
Houston's debut single, "I Like That" featuring Chingy and Nate Dogg was released on March 13, 2004, and was a hit, peaking at number three on the US Billboard Hot R&B/Hip-Hop Songs chart and number 11 on both the Billboard Hot 100 and the UK Singles Chart. His debut and only album, It's Already Written was released on August 10, 2004, being certified gold by the Recording Industry Association of America (RIAA).

Personal life

Attempted suicide (2005) 
On January 27, 2005, while on tour in London, England, Summers suffered an emotional breakdown and reportedly tried to commit suicide by jumping from a hotel window while under the influence of PCP. When people in his entourage stopped him, he was restrained and locked in a first floor room. While in that room, Summers gouged his left eye out with a plastic fork. After the incident, Summers was arrested by London police and was sent to a rehablitation facility. After a two-week stint in rehab, Houston went home to Los Angeles and apologized for the incident. Houston attributed the incident to stress caused by the music industry, saying "Everything was clobbering down on me. Everything was going a little bit too hard on me".

Discography

Albums

Singles

References

External links 
 Houston at MTV.com
 [ Houston at Allmusic.com]
 [ Houston at Billboard.com]
 

1983 births
Living people
African-American Christians
20th-century African-American male singers
American crooners
American hip hop singers
American contemporary R&B singers
American people of Belizean descent
Capitol Records artists
Singers from Los Angeles
West Coast hip hop musicians
21st-century American singers
21st-century American male singers
21st-century African-American male singers